The Lunatic at Large is a 1921 British silent comedy film directed by Henry Edwards and starring Edwards, Chrissie White and Gwynne Herbert. The screenplay concerns an aristocratic matron who attempts to arrange a suitable marriage for her daughter. It is based on the novel of the same title by J. Storer Clouston. It was remade as a 1927 American film of the same title.

Cast
 Henry Edwards as Mandell Essington
 Chrissie White as Lady Irene
 Lyell Johnstone as Baron Gauche
 Gwynne Herbert as Countess Coyley
 George Dewhurst as Dr. Welsh
 Hugh Clifton as Dr. Twiddell
 James Annand as Dr. Congleton
 P.K. Esdaile as Dr. Watson
 Buena Bent as Lady Alicia a Fyre
 John MacAndrews as Attendant

References

Bibliography
 Low, Rachael. History of the British Film, 1918-1929. George Allen & Unwin, 1971.

External links

1921 films
British silent feature films
1921 comedy films
Films directed by Henry Edwards
British comedy films
British black-and-white films
Hepworth Pictures films
Films based on British novels
1920s English-language films
1920s British films
Silent comedy films